The Ozora Festival, stylised as O.Z.O.R.A., is an annual transformational festival and arts festival near the Hungarian village of Ozora.

History and growth 
The festival has been held on an estate in Ozora near the small village of Dádpuszta every year since 2004. The first modern music festival held in Ozora was called Solipse and took place during the Solar eclipse of August 11, 1999. Solipse' had a sequel in Zambia 2001,  but in Ozora' did not get a sequel until the first Ozora Festival was held in 2004.

The Ozora is, with Solar Festival, one of the two sizeable transformational festivals in Hungary. One of the largest psychedelic trance festivals in Europe, Ozora is similar to the Boom Festival in Portugal, Burning Man in United States, and Fusion Festival in Germany- one of the Most Famous Festivals in the World, who also reach more than 40,000 visitors every year.

Due to its success, several one-day spin-offs from the Ozora Festival have been held in several other countries such as Tokyo, Japan, Paris, France and São Paulo, Brazil.

 Reception 
Ozora is considered one of the "leading festivals" around the world, "one of the largest gatherings of trance and psychedelic music in the world", and according to Trax Magazine "the principal hub of psytrance culture in Europe". La Dernière Heure'' likened Ozora to an "ecological Tomorrowland with the Peace & Love atmosphere of a 21st-century Woodstock".

Gallery

See also 
 Boom Festival
 Burning Man 
 Fusion Festival
 Full Moon Party
 Psy-Fi
 Rainbow Serpent Festival
 SkyGravity Festival
 Subsonic Music Festival
 List of electronic music festivals

References

External links 

Dance festivals in Europe
Electronic music festivals in Hungary
Trance festivals
Music festivals established in 2004
2004 establishments in Hungary